Euphaedra rattrayi is a butterfly in the family Nymphalidae. It is found in the Democratic Republic of the Congo, Uganda, Kenya and Tanzania.

Subspecies
Euphaedra rattrayi rattrayi (Democratic Republic of the Congo: Kivu, Uganda: west to the Ruwenzori massif)
Euphaedra rattrayi coeruleomaculata Hecq, 1991 (Kenya: west to the Kakamega district)

Similar species
Other members of the Euphaedra eleus species group q.v.

References

Butterflies described in 1904
rattrayi